Chen Ming-wen (born 13 May 1955) is a Taiwanese politician. He was the Chiayi County Magistrate from 2001 to 2009, until his election to the Legislative Yuan, where he has served since 2008.

Career 
In 1977, upon his graduation from National Chiayi University, he was elected to the Chiayi County Council as a councilor. In 1981, Chen was elected as Chairman of the Chiayi County Council at age 27, the youngest chairman in the history of Republic of China. Later he was elected to the Taiwan Provincial Consultative Council in 1985, while completing his degree in philosophy at Tokai University, and won subsequent elections twice in 1989 and 1994 and was again elected a legislator to the Legislative Yuan in 1998. Chen served as the Magistrate of Chiayi County from 2001 to 2008, with a satisfactory rate over 60% upon retiring his office. He became a member of the Legislative Yuan and of the Central Standing Committee of the Democratic Progressive Party. Chen is tipped to become the next generation leader of the DPP, ranked after former premier Su Tseng-Chang and the party chairman Tsai Ing-wen.

Scandal
On 3 September 2019, Chen took a Taiwan High Speed Rail train from Chiayi to North. He said he lost a suitcase (containing NT$3 million dollar) on the train. That suitcase was picked up by the staff of Taiwan high speed rail, who immediately alerted the police, and notified the owner. Then his youngest son, Chen Zheng-Ting stated that his father had provided him with funds to go to the Philippines to open a bubble tea shop to continue his mother’s career. The money was used to pay for the manufacturers’ equipments, raw materials and foreign currency accounts.

References

1955 births
Living people
Tokai University alumni
Democratic Progressive Party Members of the Legislative Yuan
Chiayi County Members of the Legislative Yuan
Members of the 7th Legislative Yuan
Members of the 8th Legislative Yuan
Members of the 9th Legislative Yuan
Magistrates of Chiayi County
Members of the 10th Legislative Yuan